Morphettville Racecourse is the main horse racing course for the Australian state of South Australia, incorporating two separate tracks. It is situated in the Adelaide suburb of Morphettville, and is about 10 km from the Adelaide city centre, and is home to the South Australian Jockey Club.

History
After years of using grounds at the East Parklands ("The Old Adelaide Racecourse", later known as Victoria Park) rented from the Adelaide City Council, a group which became the South Australian Jockey Club began using a racecourse ("Thebarton Racecourse" or "The Butchers' Course") at present-day Mile End formed on grazing land owned by E. M. Bagot and Gabriel Bennett near the River Torrens from 1859 to 1869, when the course was abandoned due to insufficient patronage. After five or six years of existence in name only, the SAJC acquired, thanks to the generosity of Sir Thomas Elder, its own freehold property at Morphettville ("The Bay of Biscay Course") and held its first meeting there on 3 January 1876. A breakaway group, which became the Adelaide Racing Club, continued to hold race meetings at "The Old Racecourse".

In 2008, firstly Victoria Park, and then in 2009 Cheltenham Park were discontinued as racing facilities, and now Adelaide race meetings are conducted only at Morphettville.

Race courses

Main 
A retractable winning post with hydraulics enables the SAJC to alternate the running of races with minimal damage to both tracks, especially with races taking place mid week and increased racing through the winter months. It was installed in 2009, and is a world first.

Secondary 
The second track, known as "The Parks", was officially opened in June 2009. A chute through the centre of the course that runs between the 850 m and 1,550 m points provides for 1250, 1300 and 1400 metre starts.

Wetlands
The Morphettville Racecourse Wetland was a joint initiative of the Patawalonga Catchment Water Management Board and the South Australian Jockey Club. It was constructed by the Board and the Jockey Club during 2001 and 2002. The wetland covers an area of 3.5 hectares, in the middle of the racecourse on the corner of Anzac Highway and Morphett Road. Costing $2.4 million to construct, it includes 100,000 plants, with the soil excavated being used to raise the level of the racecourse track. The catchment area for the wetland includes stormwater flow from two drains in Bray Street, south of the racecourse. Water enters a sediment pond where floating litter is collected in a net and large materials settle out. The water is then piped into the wetland, where it travels through a series of deep and shallow marshes. An aquifer storage and recovery system (ASR) has been constructed at the wetland. The water flowing out of the wetland is ideal for irrigation as it has very low salinity. During winter months, water is captured and pumped into a tertiary limestone aquifer below the racecourse. During the summer months, the water in the aquifer is recovered and used for irrigation. Up to 600 megalitres of water a year is recharged into the aquifer, which exceeds the amount required to irrigate the racecourse.

Access
The racecourse is just off Anzac Highway, on Morphett Road. Entry is via Morphett Road entrance or Tramway entrance. The Glenelg Tram operates throughout the day from North Terrace and Victoria Square through to Moseley Square (Glenelg). The tram stops on Morphett Road adjacent to the Morphettville Racecourse (Stop 12). A taxi rank is located inside the Members' Car Park, where taxis will make pick ups and drop offs throughout the day. Car parking at Morphettville can be found at the following locations: Morphett Road Adjacent to the Members' entrance on the opposite side of the road to the racecourse. Anzac Highway, Morphettville Junction car park, entrance to the racecourse over the tram line.

Races 
The following is a list of Group races which are run at Morphettville Racecourse.

References

External links
 South Australian Jockey Club
 Morphettville track
 'The Parks' inner track
 Hydraulic Winning Post
 Morphettville Racecourse Wetland fact sheet

Horse racing venues in Australia
1876 establishments in Australia
Sports venues in Adelaide
Sports venues completed in 1876